Golsara (also Romanized as Golsarā; also known as Gīlzārā’ī, Gol Sarā’ī, and Gul Sarāi) is a village in Zaveh Rural District, in the Central District of Zaveh County, Razavi Khorasan Province, Iran. At per the 2006 census, its population was 1,153, with 270 families.

References 

Populated places in Zaveh County